Adam Pawlikowski (1925–1976) was a Polish film actor.

Selected filmography
 Kanal (1957)
 Lotna (1959)
 Bad Luck (1960)
 Goodbye to the Past (1961)
 Ashes and Diamonds (1961- US release)
 It Started Yesterday (1961)
 Na białym szlaku (1962)
 The Saragossa Manuscript (1965)
 Dzięcioł (1971)

Bibliography
 Haltof, Marek. Polish National Cinema. Berghahn Books, 2002.

External links

1925 births
1976 deaths
Polish male film actors
Male actors from Warsaw
20th-century Polish male actors